Highway 381 is a highway in the Canadian province of Saskatchewan. It runs from Highway 80 until the Manitoba border, where it transitions into Provincial Road 547.

Highway 381 passes near the town of MacNutt and intersects Highway 8.

References

381